Bernardo Hernández de León (born 10 June 1993) is a Mexican former footballer that last played for Pacific on loan from Monterrey in Liga MX.

He was born in Cadereyta Jiménez, Nuevo León, and has represented Mexico at the 2013 CONCACAF U-20 Championship, 2013 FIFA U-20 World Cup and the 2014 Central American and Caribbean Games.

Honours
Mexico U20
CONCACAF U-20 Championship: 2013
Central American and Caribbean Games: 2014

References 

1993 births
Living people
Mexico under-20 international footballers
Liga MX players
C.F. Monterrey players
Footballers from Nuevo León
Association football fullbacks
Central American and Caribbean Games gold medalists for Mexico
Central American and Caribbean Games medalists in football
Competitors at the 2014 Central American and Caribbean Games
Mexican footballers